The archaeological site Abri de la Madeleine (Magdalene Shelter) is a rock shelter under an overhanging cliff situated near Tursac, in the Dordogne département of the Aquitaine région of southwestern France. It represents the type site of the Magdalenian culture of the Upper Paleolithic. The shelter was also occupied during the Middle Ages. The medieval castle of Petit Marsac stands on the top of the cliff just above the shelter.

Excavations
Édouard Lartet, financed and helped by the Englishman Henry Christy, were the first systematic excavators of the site, starting in 1863, and published their findings in 1875 under the name of the Age of the Reindeer ("L'âge du renne"). Objects that were found at the la Madeleine site are distributed among a number of museums, including the Muséum de Toulouse, the Musee des Antiquites Nationales, St. Germain-en-Laye and the British Museum.

The Bison Licking Insect Bite, a 20,000 year old carving (15,000 BP according to the National Museum of Prehistory) of exceptional artistic quality, was excavated at the site.

A perforated baton with low relief horse aka. Baton fragment (Palart 310), was excavated at the site.

An engraved bone rod from the cave depicts, according to Timothy Taylor (1996), a lioness licking the opening of either a gigantic human penis or a vulva.

Conservation
The Abri de la Madeleine is classified as a Monument historique since 1956.

In 1979, the Abri de la Madeleine was inscribed on the UNESCO World Heritage List as part of the Prehistoric Sites and Decorated Caves of the Vézère Valley because of its unique paleolithic artwork and archeological importance.

Gallery

References

Further reading
Laming-Emperaire, Annette. Origines de l'archéologie préhistorique en France, 1964.

External links

Abri de la Madeleine at The Magalithic Portal.

1863 archaeological discoveries
Madeleine
Madeleine
Monuments historiques of Dordogne
Prehistoric Sites and Decorated Caves of the Vézère Valley